Harold Edward Dahl (June 29, 1909 – February 14, 1956) was a mercenary American pilot who fought in the Spanish Republican Air Force during the Spanish Civil War. He was a member of the "American Patrol" of the Andres Garcia La Calle group. He was nicknamed "Whitey" due to his very blond hair.

Biography
Born in Champaign, Illinois, Dahl graduated from flying school at Kelly Field on 28 February 1933 and joined the U.S. Army Air Corps as a Second Lieutenant. His commission ended in 1936 due to gambling and subsequent court convictions. He then became a commercial pilot, but again gambling forced him to escape to Mexico.

Dahl piloted charter and cargo flights carrying material for the Second Spanish Republic, as Mexico was one of the very few distant countries to support the Spanish government. He was told about the good salary paid for mercenary pilots and so he joined Spain under the name of Hernando Diaz Evans, Evans being his mother's maiden name. He reported nine kills in this unit, though only five were ever confirmed.

During the reorganization of the Fighter Squadrons in May 1937, Dahl was posted to a squadron with a large variety of nationalities. Frank Glasgow Tinker said that this made it very hard for a pilot to coordinate his place in the group during the fighting. It seems that this was the case on June 13 of that year, where he was surprised by enemy planes and was shot down and taken prisoner.

Initially sentenced to death, there were some diplomatic movements to free Dahl. His alleged first wife Edith Rogers, a known singer of impressive beauty, was said to have visited Francisco Franco herself to plead for his life. This story later became the basis of the 1940 movie Arise, My Love. He remained in prison until 1940 and then returned to the United States. After he and Edith Rogers separated, he accepted another job, this time with the Royal Canadian Air Force (RCAF) and served during World War II. He trained RCAF pilots for combat in Europe at an airfield near Belleville, Ontario. It was here that he met his second wife Eleanor Bone, the daughter of the mayor of Belleville. After the war, he was accused of stealing decommissioned equipment from the RCAF.

Around 1951, Dahl joined the airline Swissair and lived in Switzerland. In 1953 he was caught smuggling gold with his mistress and was expelled from the country, an event that compelled his second wife to leave him. Back in Canada, he became a cargo pilot flying DC-3s when on 14 February 1956 he was killed during a crash in bad weather.

Harold Edward Dahl was survived by his three children by his second wife Eleanor:
 Jim Dahl
Stevie Cameron
 Chris Dahl

References

External links
Whitey Dahl WW2
Dahl’s short biography
List of victories for the American pilots in the Spanish Civil War

1909 births
1956 deaths
People from Champaign, Illinois
Spanish Civil War prisoners of war
American prisoners of war
Aviators killed in aviation accidents or incidents in Canada
American mercenaries
United States Army Air Forces officers
United States Army Air Forces pilots
Royal Canadian Air Force personnel of World War II
Commercial aviators
Shot-down aviators
Victims of aviation accidents or incidents in 1956